The Scottish Land Fund (SLF) was founded in 2000, as a part of land reform in Scotland. Its goal is to help communities buy their land from their landlords.

The SLF was capitalized by the UK Lottery-founded New Opportunities Fund. The initial fund was 10,000,000 GBP and this was later increased to 15,000,000 GBP.

By June 2005, the SLF had assisted roughly 200 communities.

See also 
 List of community buyouts in Scotland

References 

Real estate in the United Kingdom
Agriculture in Scotland
Economy of Scotland
2000 establishments in Scotland
Land reform in Scotland
Finance in Scotland